Angelika Klüssendorf (born 1958) is a German writer. She was born in Ahrensburg and raised in Leipzig, both in the German Democratic Republic (former East Germany). In 1985, she fled to West Germany where she has lived ever since.

She has written several books, including plays, novels and short stories. She won the Roswitha Prize in 2004.

Klüssendorf lives in Berlin.

Works
 Sehnsüchte [Erzählung], Hanser, München / Wien 1990, .
 Anfall von Glück [Erzählungen], Hanser, München / Wien 1994, .
 Frag mich nicht, schieß mich tot! Eine Farce, [erstes] Theaterstück, Manuscript beim Verlag der Autoren, Frankfurt am Main 1995, abgedruckt in: Theater der Zeit Nr. 2 /1996, Berlin 1996 ISSN 0040-5418.
 Alle leben so [Roman], Frankfurt am Main 2001, .
 Aus allen Himmeln [Erzählungen], Fischer, Frankfurt am Main 2004, .
 Amateure [Erzählungen], Fischer, Frankfurt am Main 2009, .
 Das Mädchen [Roman], Kiepenheuer & Witsch, Köln 2011,  (als Hörbuch: Das Mädchen, ungekürzte Lesung von Julia Nachtmann, Regie Margrit Osterwold, 4 CDs (263 Min.), Hörbuch, Hamburg 2011).

References

1958 births
20th-century German novelists
21st-century German novelists
Living people
Writers from Leipzig
Writers from Berlin